Tillandsia walteri is a species of flowering plant in the genus Tillandsia. This species is native to Peru.

References

walteri
Flora of Bolivia
Flora of Ecuador